NFCU may refer to:

 Navy Federal Credit Union, a credit union based in Virginia
 Nevada Federal Credit Union, a credit union in Nevada